John H. McAvoy was the founder of the McAvoy Brewing Company in Chicago, Illinois and was elected a Chicago alderman from the 3rd ward of Chicago in 1869. He served as Chicago City Council president in 1871, during the rebuilding of Chicago after the Great Chicago Fire.

References 

1830 births
1893 deaths
Businesspeople from Chicago
American brewers
19th-century American businesspeople
Chicago City Council members